The Wonders of the East (or The Marvels of the East) is an Old English prose text, probably written around AD 1000. It is accompanied by many illustrations and appears also in two other manuscripts, in both Latin and Old English. It describes a variety of odd, magical and barbaric creatures that inhabit Eastern regions, such as Babylonia, Persia, Egypt, and India. The Wonders can be found in three extant manuscripts from the 11th and 12th centuries, the earliest of these being the famous Nowell Codex, which is also the only manuscript containing Beowulf. The Old English text was originally translated from a Latin text now referred to as De rebus in Oriente mirabilibus, and remains mostly faithful to the Latin original.

Contents

The wonders described are huge dragons who prevent travel, phoenixes  born from ashes, and hens in Lentibelsinea who burn peoples’ bodies when they are touched. The Wonders of the East also tells of incredible scenarios, like how to steal gold from giant ants. Fantastical and barbaric people are also mentioned, for example, the Donestre race of cannibals, the Homodubii half human and half donkey creatures, and the panotti, with their fan-like ears, which they sleep on and with which they cover themselves. The Wonders of the East is an Anglo-Saxon contribution to the mirabilia genre, "literature in which a traveler in foreign lands describes exotic sights in a letter home.” In addition, The Wonders of the East demonstrates the “mutual mistrust” between men and monsters because the creatures either flee from humans, harm those that come near them, or eat people. The further away from Anglo-Saxon England, the stranger these creatures become, reflecting Anglo-Saxon construction of the East through cultural and racial typecasting according to Edward Said.

Manuscript versions

Nowell Codex 

The Wonders of the East is found in three manuscripts. It is in the Beowulf manuscript (also known as the Nowell Codex, London, British Library, Cotton Vitellius A. xv). It is written in Late West Saxon in a Mercian dialect. Other than Beowulf and The Wonders of the East, the other works in this codex include: The Passion of St. Christopher, The Letter of Alexander to Aristotle, and Judith. One scribe is believed to have copied The Passion of St. Christopher, The Letter of Alexander to Aristotle, The Wonders of the East, and first part of Beowulf, and another scribe wrote the remainder of Beowulf and Judith. While the first scribe, known as Scribe A used a more traditional square insular minuscule script, Scribe B uses a newer, round minuscule script. This has made it quite difficult to date the codex, as both scripts originate from slightly different periods of Anglo-Saxon society. The date of this manuscript is usually believed to be “within a couple of decades of A.D. 1000,” argued to be no earlier than AD 997 and no later than AD 1016, although other scholars have dated it to be from as early as the 8th century. The earliest known owner of the codex was antiquarian Laurence Nowell, who left his signature in the top margin of several pages from the manuscript. The manuscript is heavily damaged from the fire of Cotton Library in 1731 and so some parts of accompanying texts are missing. The codex may have been intentionally put together because four of the manuscripts discuss monsters. Furthermore, it is a “liber monstrorum, or book of marvels, designed for entertainment along with usual edification. Andy Orchard argues the monsters witnessed in The Wonders of the East are identifiable in other texts of the manuscript. The "Donestre", cannibal creatures who lure "foreigners" in with "devious words" before eating all but their heads. These monsters sit and "weep over the head", which scholars such as Orchard have used to show how the creature resembles Grendel's Mother from Beowulf. Orchard further argues that these monsters reflect those who do not conform to Anglo-Saxon norms, and are a construction of the "other". Christopher Monk discusses theories focused on the sexuality and femininity of the monsters found in The Wonders of the East. He claims these monsters are depictions of human sexuality, aided by the illuminations which accompany the prose. The Wonders of the East is the only text from the Nowell Codex to be illustrated or "illuminated" which some highlight as central to the monster studies applied to the manuscript. Orchard argues that the text is a "liber monstorum" or "book of monsters" and illustrations aid the reader in studying the creatures described in the prose. Other creatures encountered include the snakes, which may stand for dragon. These creatures are said to have "horns as large as rams" and anyone who "strikes them or touches them" will die and the area around them "set ablaze". Another creature called a "conopenae", said to have the head of a dog which some scholars have argued links with Saint Christopher from an earlier text, who may have had the head of a dog according to legend.

Other manuscripts 
The Wonders of the East is also preserved in the Cotton Tiberius B.v, in both Latin and Old English, which was written down around AD 1050. Tiberius B. v is considered to be a "book of nature" with "encyclopedic potentiality". After fire damage, it measures 260 x 220 mm., making it one of the largest English computus manuscripts.  As The Wonders of the East appears in both Latin and Old English in Tiberius B. v, it takes up an entire quire of eight, as well as the first two leaves of the next quire, with the Latin written before the Old English. It contains five additions to the text, including an excerpt drawn from the ancient Apocryphon of Jannes and Jambres.

In addition, it appears in the Oxford Bodleian Library, Bodleian 614 manuscript in Latin. Much like The Nowell Codex, Bodleian 614 is difficult to date and is debated by scholars to date anywhere from the early 12th century to the "last quarter" of the 12th century. The three manuscripts each differ in text and focus, but “all the Anglo-Saxon versions derive ultimately from a continental group of Latin texts, almost all of which share a basic epistolary framework entirely lacking in the Anglo-Saxon versions, and in which a variously-named traveler reports back to his emperor.” More specifically, The Wonders of the East is initially from Greek origin. It was then “taken from a Latin collection of Mirabilia” (Wrenn 253). Furthermore, Alexander's Letter to Aristotle, also in the Nowell Codex, shares similar subject matter with The Wonders of the East and probably has a similar origin. The Anglo-Saxon Wonders of the East exists in many manuscripts with a similar epistolary structure, “in which either a character variously named Feramen, Feramus, or Fermes writes to the Emperor Hadrian (A.D. 117-38), or a figure called Premo, Premonis, Perimenis, or Parmoenis writes to Hadrian’s predecessor, the Emperor Trajan (A.D 98-116), to report on the many marvels he has witnessed on his travels.”

All three manuscripts are illustrated with fairly simple pictures. Space was reserved for the illustrations on each page and then later filled in after the text was written. The Tiberius manuscript most intricately illustrates the 37 marvels described in both Latin and Old English.  The Bodleian 614 manuscript, only in Latin, depicts 49 wonders. Lastly, the Nowell Codex, in Old English, contains only 32 images. The images parallel the text, and provide a picture of the described creatures. The Wonders of the East may be considered a pseudo-scientific text because of the illustrations. Therefore, the images are “possibly intended to lend a note of authority by making specific plants, animals, or monsters easier to recognize.” In addition, the images are simple and have one or two figures in each illustration. More specifically, “One of the most important characteristics of... their illustrations is that the races are seen in some sort of relationship to the viewer, rather than in isolation of an empty frame.” In Tiberius B. v, every section except for the gold digging ants are accompanied by an illustration. Christopher Monk argues the illustrations in The Wonders of the East of the Beowulf manuscript play an important role in studies of the creatures as representative of human sexuality and the act of "othering" femininity.

See also

 Trees of Sun and Moon

References

Notes

Sources

Baker, Peter. “Beowulf.” Medieval England: Encyclopedia. Ed. Paul E. Szarmack, M. Teresa Tavormina, Joel T. Rosenthal. New York: Garland Pub., 1998.
Fulk, R. D. The Beowulf Manuscript Cambridge, Massachusetts: Harvard University Press, 2010
Friedman, John Block. The Monstrous Races in Medieval Art and Thought. Cambridge: Harvard University Press, 1981.
Jones, Timothy. “The Marvels of the East.” Medieval England: Encyclopedia. Ed. Paul E. Szarmack, M. Teresa Tavormina, Joel T. Rosenthal. New York: Garland Pub., 1998.
Karkov, Catherine E. “Anglo-Saxon Art.” Medieval England: Encyclopedia. Ed. Paul E. Szarmack, M. Teresa Tavormina, Joel T. Rosenthal. New York: Garland Pub., 1998.
Mittman, Asa Simon. Maps and Monsters in Medieval England. New York: Routledge, 2006.
Monk, Christopher, "A Context for the Sexualisation of Monsters in The Wonders of the East", Anglo-Saxon England, 41: 79–99.
Orchard, Andy. “Marvels of the East.” The Blackwell Encyclopedia of Anglo-Saxon England. Ed. Michael Lapidge. Oxford: Blackwell Publishers, 1999.
Orchard, Andy. Pride and Prodigies: Studies in the Monsters of the Beowulf Manuscript. University of Toronto Press, 2003. 
Sisam, Kenneth. Studies in the History of Old English Literature. Oxford: Clarendon Press, 1953.
Wrenn, Charles Leslie. A Study of Old English Literature. London: George G. Harrap & Co. Ltd, 1967.

External links
 Full digital coverage of Cotton Vitellius A. xv on the British Library's Digitised Manuscripts website
The Wild Man: Medieval Myth and Symbolism, an exhibition catalog from The Metropolitan Museum of Art (fully available online as PDF), which contains material on Wonders of the East (nos. 1&2)

Old English literature
Books about India
Books about Asia